Spider-Man and the X-Men in Arcade's Revenge is a video game first released for the Super NES in 1992 by LJN. It was later released for the Genesis and Game Gear (under the Flying Edge brand) as well as the Game Boy. The game features Marvel Comics characters Spider-Man and the X-Men as they battle their captor, the villainous Arcade.

Summary 
While swinging his web throughout the city, Spider-Man notices the disappearances of X-Men Cyclops, Storm, and Wolverine; he then notices a tube from a garbage truck sucking up Gambit, and after figuring out it's Arcade, swings his web to the truck. He tracks Arcade down to an abandoned building, which is the location of the first stage; the player portrays Spider-Man de-activating "Security Eyes" in a set order (as indicated by the Spider-Sense) to enter. Inside, he, along with Cyclops, Storm, Wolverine and Gambit, are placed in the deadly games of Murderworld, a simulated program designed by Arcade to torture and kill his victims. 

The player must successfully complete each Marvel hero's two "events" in order to get to control Spider-Man in a final battle with Arcade and escape. While any character's first event can be selected at the player's will, his or her second event isn't playable until the completion of the first. All the heroes have the same lives, meaning if one hero loses a life, the others do as well.

 Spider-Man's levels: New York City rooftops with the bosses being the flying demon N'astirh and Shocker in the first stage, with Rhino and Carnage in the second stage.
 Storm's levels: Underwater maze level with Storm having a limited air supply. Her bosses are various machines used to control the giant tank-like levels.
 Wolverine's levels: Fun house first level, with duplicates of the clown villain Obnoxio the Clown as enemies and the boss being Apocalypse. A rampaging Juggernaut chases him throughout the second stage.
 Gambit's levels: Doom caves two levels, both of which take place in a cave where a giant spiked ball is chasing him; the first level boss being a giant playing card, the final boss a gigantic robotic version of Selene.
 Cyclops' levels: Two stages, each set in Genosha underground Sentinel mines, plus a final boss stage featuring Master Mold.

After completing each stage, the player controls each hero as they fight in similar-designed mini-levels themed after the "behind-the-scenes" of Murderworld. The only character to have a significant change is Storm, who now walks, shoots multiple bolts of lightning rapidly and calls upon gusts of wind and jumps about four times the height of the other characters. The last level takes place inside a large room, where Arcade chases Spider-Man back and forth in a large Arcade-shaped robot, which operates like a Matryoshka doll, until Arcade is finally defeated. The X-Men stand-by at the edges of the room, occasionally attacking on their own.

After surviving the deadly traps and defeating arcade, he blows the building up. Spider-Man and the others survive but there is no sign of Arcade.

Development and release

According to Richard Kay of Software Creations, development of the game was fraught with problems: "Spider-Man And X-Men started going horribly wrong and Acclaim were screaming at us and threatening litigation and we ended up with three teams on this one game". The Genesis and Super NES editions of the game are nearly identical, apart from different instrumentation in the soundtrack.

Reception

Reviewing the Game Boy version, GamePro commented the graphics are good but the controls are frustratingly imprecise and complained of the fact that players must re-solve the tedious level 1 maze every time they start the game. They gave the Game Gear version a negative review as well, saying it retains the problems of the Game Boy version. Electronic Gaming Monthly gave the Game Gear version a 6 out of 10, praising the ability to play as multiple different characters but criticizing the difficulty as overly high. Brett Alan Weiss of AllGame criticized the Game Gear version for "awkward" controls, particularly of Spider-Man and its weak portrayals of the superheroes. Super Gamer reviewed the SNES Version and gave an overall score of 75% stating: "A whole host of superheroes make this attractive for any comics fan. Gameplay is varied and tough, graphics impressive and sound brilliant".

Notes

References

Citations

Works cited

External links

1992 video games
Acclaim Entertainment games
Cajuns in video games
Game Boy games
LJN games
Platform games
Game Gear games
Sega Genesis games
Software Creations games
Super Nintendo Entertainment System games
Superhero crossover video games
Video games based on Spider-Man
Video games based on X-Men
Video games developed in the United Kingdom
Video games scored by Tim Follin
Video games set in Africa
Video games set in New York City
Video games featuring female protagonists